Hlatikulu Forest is a coastal scarp forest in the Lebombo Mountains of South Africa, between Ingwavuma and the Pongola Gorge.  The forest is also known as the Gwaliweni Forest.

History
It is the site of the murder of the Zulu King Dingane by Zulu Nyawo, iNkosi Sambane of the Nyawo Royal House and Nondawana.  After being stabbed to death, Dingane was buried beneath a large fig tree at his residence at eSankoleni.  Three large stones were used to mark the grave.

General
Bird species recorded here include the lemon dove (Aplopelia larvata), trumpeter hornbill (Bycanistes bucinator), olive woodpecker (Dendropicos griseocephalus), pink-throated twinspot (Hypargos margaritatus), Livingstone's turaco (Tauraco livingstonii) and African crowned eagle (Stephanoaetus coronatus).

Tree species found here include the Lebombo ironwood (Androstachys johnsonii) and Lebombo krantz ash (Atalaya alata).

See also
Forests of KwaZulu-Natal

References

 Pooley, E. (1993). The Complete Field Guide to Trees of Natal, Zululand and Transkei. .

History of KwaZulu-Natal
Forests of South Africa